Euro League Baseball (ELB) was a professional baseball league in Europe founded by the European Association of Professional Baseball (EAPB) which played a single season in 2016. The winner of the ELB was awarded the Gregory Halman Trophy. ELB played its inaugural season in 2016 with three teams: Draci Brno, Haar Disciples and Buchbinder Legionäre Regensburg. The league's only championship was awarded to Draci Brno.

Organization
EAPD held a 60% stake in Euro League Baseball Ltd. which is the operator of the EBL and holds all naming and media rights as well as all partnership and sponsor contracts regarding Euro League Baseball. EAPB President Wim van den Hurk was the CEO of Euro League Baseball Ltd.

Teams

2016 season
The inaugural ELB season in 2016 was contested by three teams: Draci Brno, Haar Disciples, Buchbinder Legionäre Regensburg. Each team played a total of 8 regular season games (4 at home and 4 away) between April and July.

Amsterdam Baseball
A team called Amsterdam Baseball was founded with the purpose to compete in ELB, and to be run by the league. The backbone of the team was supposed to be players from Amsterdam Pirates, but also some previously retired players like Dirk van 't Klooster and Chris Mowday. However, when the season was already well underway, Amsterdam Baseball had to withdraw from the league due to pressure from the European and Dutch baseball federations. This left the league with only three teams for its inaugural season.

Standings

See also
Baseball awards#Europe
Australian Baseball League
Division Élite
Bundesliga
Honkbal Hoofdklasse
Italian Baseball League
Major League Baseball

References

External links
 
 

Euro League Baseball
Sports leagues established in 2015
Sports leagues disestablished in 2016
Defunct baseball leagues
2015 establishments in Europe
2016 disestablishments in Europe
Defunct sports leagues in Europe